Matko Obradović (born 11 May 1991) is a Croatian footballer who plays as a goalkeeper for Slovenian PrvaLiga side Celje.

Career
Obradović, coming from the Pelješac peninsula, played in his hometown Orebić, before moving for a season to Jadran LP, and then, aged 16, to a trial at Hajduk Split. After a few test matches there, he joined the nearby Druga HNL team Mosor. There, while a member of the under-19 team, he played 13 matches for the senior team, and, in the summer of 2010, won the Croatian U19 amateur championship.

After that, he joined Koper in early 2011. Not getting a single cap for the first team, he signed for Krka in the Slovenian Second League. Achieving promotion to the Slovenian PrvaLiga, Obradović was selected in the best team of the 2013–14 season. After that, he moved to Maribor, where he won two league championships, and played two times in the group stage of the UEFA Champions League. After four years at Maribor, he moved to Mura in 2018. With Mura, he won the 2020–21 Slovenian PrvaLiga, which was the first ever league title of the club.

Honours
Maribor
Slovenian PrvaLiga: 2014–15, 2016–17
Slovenian Cup: 2015–16

Mura
Slovenian PrvaLiga: 2020–21
Slovenian Cup: 2019–20

References

External links
 
 Matko Obradović at NZS 

1991 births
Living people
People from Orebić
Sportspeople from Dubrovnik
Association football goalkeepers
Croatian footballers
NK Mosor players
FC Koper players
NK Krka players
NK Maribor players
NŠ Mura players
NK Celje players
Slovenian Second League players
Slovenian PrvaLiga players
Croatian expatriate footballers
Expatriate footballers in Slovenia
Croatian expatriate sportspeople in Slovenia